John Laurens Manning Irby (September 10, 1854December 9, 1900) was a United States senator from South Carolina. Born in Laurens, he attended Laurensville Male Academy (Lauren), Princeton College (Princeton, New Jersey in 1870-1871, and the University of Virginia at Charlottesville from 1871 to 1873. He studied law, was admitted to the bar in 1875, commenced practice at Cheraw, and returned to Laurens. He was appointed lieutenant colonel of the South Carolina Militia in 1877 and that year was also intendant of Lauren. He was a member of the South Carolina House of Representatives from 1886 to 1892, serving as speaker in 1890.

Irby was elected as a Democrat to the U.S. Senate and served from March 4, 1891, to March 4, 1897; he was not a candidate for reelection. While in the Senate, he was chairman of the Committee on Transportation Routes to the Seaboard (Fifty-third Congress). Irby was subsequently an unsuccessful candidate for election to the United States Senate in 1897 to fill the vacancy caused by the death of his cousin Joseph H. Earle, and was a delegate to the State constitutional convention in 1895. He resumed the practice of law and also engaged in agricultural pursuits; he died in Laurens in 1900; interment was in the City Cemetery.

Joseph H. Earle, Irby's cousin, and Elias Earle, his great-grandfather, had both been members of the U.S. Congress.

References

1854 births
1900 deaths
Democratic Party United States senators from South Carolina
Speakers of the South Carolina House of Representatives
Democratic Party members of the South Carolina House of Representatives
People from Laurens, South Carolina
University of Virginia alumni
19th-century American politicians